Andrija Otenhajmer (16 October 1926 – 26 March 1999) was a Yugoslav middle-distance runner. He competed in the men's 1500 metres at the 1952 Summer Olympics.

References

1926 births
1999 deaths
Athletes (track and field) at the 1952 Summer Olympics
Yugoslav male middle-distance runners
Olympic athletes of Yugoslavia
Place of birth missing
Mediterranean Games silver medalists for Yugoslavia
Mediterranean Games medalists in athletics
Athletes (track and field) at the 1951 Mediterranean Games